Samuel Brownlee House is a historic building in Washington, Pennsylvania.  It is designated as a historic residential landmark/farmstead by the Washington County History & Landmarks Foundation.

References

External links
[ National Register nomination form]

Houses on the National Register of Historic Places in Pennsylvania
Georgian architecture in Pennsylvania
Houses completed in 1846
Houses in Washington County, Pennsylvania
National Register of Historic Places in Washington County, Pennsylvania